Election Committee usually refers to the Election Committee of Hong Kong.

Election Committee may also refer to:

Election Committee (constituency), Hong Kong
2001 Election Committee (Legislative Council constituency) by-election, Hong Kong
Election Committee (Parliament of Norway)

See also
Election commission